Rūm millet (millet-i Rûm), or "Roman nation", was the name of the Eastern Orthodox Christian community in the Ottoman Empire. Despite being subordinated within the Ottoman political system, the community maintained a certain internal autonomy.

Establishment and development

After the fall of Constantinople to the Ottoman Empire in 1453, all Orthodox Christians were treated as a lower class of people. The Rum millet was instituted by Sultan Mehmet II who set himself to reorganise the state as the conscious heir of the East Roman Empire. The Orthodox congregation was included in a specific ethno-religious community under Graeco-Byzantine domination. Its name was derived from the former Eastern Roman (a.k.a. Byzantine) subjects of the Ottoman Empire, but all Orthodox Greeks, Bulgarians, Albanians, Aromanians, Megleno-Romanians and Serbs, as well as Georgians and Middle Eastern Christians, were considered part of the same millet in spite of their differences in ethnicity and language. Belonging to this Orthodox commonwealth became more important to the common people than their ethnic origins. This community became a basic form of social organization and source of identity for all the ethnic groups inside it and most people began to identify themselves simply as "Christians". However, under Ottoman rule ethnonyms never disappeared, which indicates that some form of ethnic identification was preserved. This is evident from a Sultan's Firman from 1680 which lists the ethnic groups in the Balkan lands of the Empire as follows: Greeks (Rum), Albanians (Arnaut), Serbs (Sirf), "Vlachs" (Eflak, referring to the Aromanians and Megleno-Romanians) and the Bulgarians (Bulgar). Christian Armenians who belonged to the Armenian Apostolic Church were not included as they were given a separate millet.

Christians were guaranteed some limited freedoms, but they were not considered equal to Muslims, and their religious practices would have to defer to those of Muslims, in addition to various other legal limitations. The Ecumenical Patriarch of Constantinople was recognized as the highest religious and political leader, or ethnarch, of all Orthodox subjects. The Serbian Patriarchate of Peć and the Bulgarian Archbishopric of Ohrid, which were autonomous Eastern Orthodox Churches under the tutelage of the Ecumenical Patriarch, were taken over by the Greek Phanariotes during the 18th century. The Treaty of Küçük Kaynarca, from 1774, allowed Russia to intervene on the side of Ottoman Eastern Orthodox subjects, and most of the Porte's political tools of pressure became ineffective. At that time the Rum millet had a great deal of power—it set its own laws and collected and distributed its own taxes. The rise of nationalism in Europe under the influence of the French Revolution had extended to the Ottoman Empire and the Rum millet became increasingly independent with the establishment of its own schools, churches, hospitals and other facilities. These activities effectively moved the Christian population outside the framework of the Ottoman political system.

During Ottoman rule, those in the millet were provided with certain protections and privileges, and were treated with preference over Catholic Christians. In some areas such as Crete, both Muslims and Orthodox Christians were permitted to attempt to convert the local Catholic population. This bias towards the Orthodox worked to secure the loyalty of those within the millet. It worked to make newly conquered citizens focus less on internal divisions and more on the conflict between Orthodoxy and Catholicism. Further encouragement of Orthodox artisans who made ecclesiastical silverware, robes, and chalices made Constantinople, although under Ottoman rule, a still-vibrant hub of Orthodoxy.

Rise of nationalism and decline
In the early 19th century, the Greek Orthodox intellectuals tried to reconceptualize the Rum millet. They argued for a new, ethnic "Romaic" national identity and new Byzantine state, but their visions of a future state included all Balkan Orthodox Christians. This Megali Idea implied the goal of reviving the Eastern Roman Empire by establishing a new Greek state. It spread among the urban population of Aromanian, Slavic and Albanian origin and it started to view itself increasingly as Greek. On the other hand, the Ottoman Tanzimat reforms in the middle of the 19th century were aimed to encourage Ottomanism among the secessionist subject nations and stop the nationalist movements within the Empire, but failed to succeed. With the rise of nationalism under the Ottoman Empire, the Rum millet began to degrade with the continuous identification of the religious creed with ethnic nationality. The national awakening of each ethnic group inside it was complex and most of the groups interacted with each other. The Bulgarian Exarchate recognized by the Ottomans in 1870 was only a link in a series of events following the unilateral declaration of an autocephalous Orthodox Church of Greece in 1833 and of Romania in 1865.

The 1877–1878 Russo-Turkish War dealt a decisive blow to Ottoman power in the Balkan Peninsula. The Serbian Orthodox Church also became autocephalous in 1879. The Albanians' fear that the lands they inhabited would be partitioned among neighbouring Montenegro, Serbia, Bulgaria and Greece fueled the rise of Albanian nationalism and the League of Prizren was founded. The recognition of the Aromanians as a distinct millet (the Ullah Millet) in the Ottoman Empire in 1905 was the final straw in this Balkan nationalistic competition. As a result, intense ethnic and national rivalries among the Balkan peoples emerged at the eve of the 20th century in Macedonia. That was followed by a series of conflicts among Greeks (Grecomans), Serbs (Serbomans), Bulgarians (Bulgarophiles) and Aromanians (Rumanophiles) in the region. The Young Turk Revolution of 1908 restored the Parliament, which had been suspended by the Sultan in 1878. However, the process of supplanting the monarchic institutions was unsuccessful and the European periphery of the Empire continued to splinter under the pressures of local revolts.

Subsequently, with the Balkan Wars (1912–1923) and the First World War (1914–1918) the Ottoman Empire lost virtually most of its possessions, except these in Asia Minor. During  these wars and the following Greco-Turkish War (1919–1922) the Orthodox Christians there were subject to persecution and deportation, and the Assyrians and Greeks even to a Genocide. That put de facto end to the community of the Rum millet. The Treaty of Lausanne from 1923, led to the recognition of the new Republic of Turkey and to the end of the Ottoman Empire itself.

See also 
 Rûm
 Millet (Ottoman Empire)
 Rumelia
 Phanariotes
 Ecumenical Patriarchate of Constantinople
 Antiochian Greek Christians
 Bulgarian Millet

References

Bibliography

Further reading

 Greek Millet Constitution: .
  - The French translation of the Greek Millet Constitution is in Volume 2 of 7, pages 21-34.

Sources 
 From Rum Millet to Greek Nation: Enlightenment, Secularization, and National Identity in Ottoman Balkan Society, 1453–1821, Victor Roudometof.
 Balkan cultural commonality and ethnic diversity. Raymond Detrez (Ghent University, Belgium).

History of the Ottoman Empire
Christianity in the Ottoman Empire
Serbs from the Ottoman Empire
Greeks from the Ottoman Empire
Bulgarians from the Ottoman Empire
Albanians from the Ottoman Empire
Ottoman period in the Balkans
Eastern Orthodox Christians